Freeman Harris Solicitors is an English law firm based in London and Dunstable. In 2010, Freeman Harris became the first law firm to operate a legal store in a shopping centre in the UK.   The firm offers legal services to private and public sector organisations and private individuals.

Company

The company was started in December, 2006, by Ian Freeman and Sam Harris, with an office in Bermondsey, London. Freeman Harris was one of the founding members of QualitySolicitors, which is an alliance of independent law firms in the United Kingdom. In 2010, the company become the first law firm to operate a legal store in a shopping mall in Lewisham. The store offered legal advice and services to visitors in a shop style format.

In 2013, Freeman Harris partnered with LegalForce to provide legal solutions online and in stores to small businesses and start-ups. The partnership has since dissolved and both firms work independently.

Services
Freeman Harris's practice areas include:

 Charities
 Contracts
 Corporate
 Dispute Resolution & Litigation
 Employment
 Family law
 Personal injury
 Private Clients
 Immigration
 Intellectual Property
 Public Law
 Solicitor Advocacy

References

External links 
 
 TrademarkHub - Trademark registration site

Law firms of England
Law firms based in London